Speiredonia celebensis is a species of moth of the family Erebidae first described by Willem Hogenes and Alberto Zilli in 2005. It is found on Sulawesi and the Moluccas.

The length of the forewings is 28–30 mm for males and 27–30 mm for females.

External links
 

Moths described in 2005
Speiredonia